The British decimal halfpenny (p) coin was a denomination of sterling coinage introduced in February 1971, at the time of decimalisation, and was worth  of one pound. It was ignored in banking transactions, which were carried out in units of 1p.

The decimal halfpenny had the same value as 1.2 pre-decimal pence, and was introduced to enable the prices of some low-value items to be more accurately translated to the new decimal currency. The possibility of setting prices including an odd half penny also made it more practical to retain the pre-decimal sixpence in circulation (with a value of  new pence) alongside the new decimal coinage.

The halfpenny coin's obverse featured the profile of Queen Elizabeth II; the reverse featured an image of St Edward's Crown. It was minted in bronze (like the 1p and 2p coins). It was the smallest decimal coin in both size and value. The size was in proportion to the 1p and 2p coins. It soon became Britain's least favourite coin. The Treasury had continued to argue that the halfpenny was important in the fight against inflation (preventing prices from being rounded up). The coin was demonetised and withdrawn from circulation in December 1984.

Design

Only one design of obverse was used on the halfpenny coin. Both sides of the coin are encircled by dots, a common feature on coins, known as beading.

As on all decimal coins produced before 1984, the portrait of Queen Elizabeth II by Arnold Machin appeared on the obverse; in this portrait the Queen wears the 'Girls of Great Britain and Ireland' Tiara.

Status 
The half penny coin was legal tender for amounts not exceeding 20 pence. However, legal tender in the UK has a very narrow meaning, that is unlikely to affect everyday transactions. Legal tender means that a debtor can not be successfully sued for non-payment of a debt if he has offered unconditionally to pay in legal tender. The defendant in such a case would be able to raise a defence of tender before claim.

A shopkeeper, for example, was not under any obligation to accept half penny coins for payment; conversely they have the discretion to accept payment in just half penny coins if they so wished.

Mintages
Annual number of coins released into general circulation (excludes proof sets)
1971 ~ 1,394,188,251
1972 ~ In proof sets only
1973 ~ 365,680,000
1974 ~ 365,448,000
1975 ~ 197,600,000
1976 ~ 412,172,000
1977 ~ 66,368,000
1978 ~ 59,532,000
1979 ~ 219,132,000
1980 ~ 202,788,000
1981 ~ 46,748,000
1982 ~ 190,752,000
1983 ~ 7,600,000
1984 ~ In proof sets and 'uncirculated' sets only
Mintage figures above represent the number of coins of each date released for circulation. Mint Sets have been produced since 1982; where mintages on or after that date indicate 'none', there are examples contained within those sets.

Proposed quarter penny coin
A decimal quarter-penny coin (to be struck in aluminium) was also proposed (which would have allowed the pre-decimal threepence to continue to circulate with a value of  new pence), but was never produced.

See also

 Halfpenny (Irish decimal coin)

References

External links
British Halfpenny pictures
CoinWiki - Decimal Half Pennies
Coin Type: Half Penny, United Kingdom - Online Coin Club

Halfpenny
Currencies introduced in 1971
Decimalisation
Half-cent coins